2020 CAF Champions League may refer to:

 2019–20 CAF Champions League
 2020–21 CAF Champions League